WDBQ may refer to:

 WDBQ (AM), a radio station (1490 AM) licensed to Dubuque, Iowa, United States
 WDBQ-FM, a radio station (107.5 FM) licensed to Galena, Illinois, United States